Phoenix paludosa (paludosa, Latin, swampy), also called the mangrove date palm, is a species of flowering plant in the palm family, indigenous to coastal regions of India, Bangladesh, Myanmar, Thailand, Cambodia, Sumatra, Vietnam and peninsular Malaysia.  They are also known as Sea Dates. The trees grow in clusters, to 5 m high, usually forming dense thickets. The leaves are 2 to 3 m long and recurved. Similar to Nypa Leaves, but smaller and placed towards the plant's top.

References

Riffle, Robert L. and Craft, Paul (2003) An Encyclopedia of Cultivated Palms. Portland: Timber Press.  /  (page 403)

paludosa
Flora of the Indian subcontinent
Flora of Indo-China
Flora of Peninsular Malaysia
Flora of Sumatra
Plants described in 1832
Central Indo-Pacific flora